CNS Productions is a publisher of educational materials — primarily textbooks and instructional DVDs — dealing with psychoactive drugs and addiction. It was formed in 1983 by Paul Steinbroner, with long-time collaborator William E. Cohen who had an extensive background in medical film production. CNS Productions has produced and distributed over fifty separate titles on issues related to the neurobehavioral effects of psychoactive drugs.

Darryl Inaba, PharmD, 2018 Sole Owner, president, current CNS CEO, former CEO and President of San Francisco's Haight Ashbury Free Clinic served as a consultant on all of the films CNS produced, and co-authored Uppers, Downers, All Arounders  which was originally published in 1989 to support the film of the same name. Inaba formally joined CNS in 2006.

"CNS" is a reference to the central nervous system.

Publications

Uppers, Downers, All Arounders: Physical and Mental Effects of Psychoactive Drugs by William E. Cohen, and Darryl Inaba, PharmDUppers, Downers, All Arounders, a college-level textbook, addresses psychoactive drugs and compulsive behaviors, relying on the most current data and studies as well as practical information and interviews drawn from treatment professionals and their clients. The material provides insights into the complex fields of drug abuse, compulsive behaviors, addiction, treatment, recovery, and prevention. It has been adopted by over 400 colleges and universities.Printing History — EditionsFirst: 1989
Second: 1993
Third: 1997
Fourth: 2000
Fifth: 2004
Sixth: 2007
Seventh: 2011
Eighth: 2014Beyond Opiates: The Evolving Science of Pain and Addiction by Paul J. Steinbroner and Darryl S. Inaba, 2015

This 40-page, hand-illustrated graphic novella is a tool for educators and treatment providers seeking an engaging and entertaining way to introduce people to the science of opiate addiction. The novella demonstrates the information from our feature film Beyond Opiates in an easy-to-understand and accessible format that will educate and open pathways for discussion. Featured topics include natural pain relievers vs. pain killers, tolerance and hyperalgesia, withdrawal and PAWS, understanding craving, and more.

Films
"Uppers, Downers, All Arounders," 1984
Haight Asbury Cocaine Film, 1985
"A Matter of Balance," 1986
Haight Ashbury Crack Film, 1987
"From Opium to Heroin"- 1988
Haight Ashbury Training Series volumes 1-5, 1992–94
"Marijuana: the Mirror that Magnifies," 1995
"Methamphetamine: The Rush to Crash," 1996
"In and Out of Control: Emotional, Physical & Sexual Violence," 1997
"Compulsive Gambling & Recovery," 1997
"Roots of Addiction," 1998
"Heroin: From Pleasure to Pain," 1999
"Alcohol and Its Effects," 2000
"Sports and Drugs," 2001
"Compulsive Gambling: Signs & Symptoms," 2001
"The Other Gamblers: Seniors & Women," 2001
"Psychoactive: Club Drugs & Inhalants," 2002
"Cocaine & Crack: A Craving for More," 2003
"Prescription & OTC Abuse," 2004
"Co-Occurring Disorders: Mental Health & Drugs," 2005
"Medical Consequences of Addiction," 2005
"Marijuana: Neurochemistry & Physiology," 2006
"Methamphetamine: Neurochemistry and Recovery," 2007
"Neurochemistry of Relapse and Recovery," 2008
10-part series: Use, Abuse and Addiction (2009)
"Drug and Behavioral Addictions: Roots of Addiction"
"The Neurochemistry of the Roots of Addiction," 2011
"Reflections in a Rearview Mirror: How I Got My DUI, Costs & Losses, Physiology, Levels of Use, and How My Life Changed for the Better" (5 parts) - 2013

References

External links
 Official website
CNS Productions Bio
Dr. Darryl S. Inaba's Blog
The Haight Ashbury Free Clinics
Rock Medicine
Uppers, Downers, All Arounders video

 

Publishing companies established in 1983
Book publishing companies based in Oregon
Companies based in Medford, Oregon
1983 establishments in Oregon